KBKO (88.3 FM, "Sacred Heart Radio") is a radio station licensed to serve the community of Kodiak, Alaska. The station is owned by Sacred Heart Radio, Inc. It airs a Catholic radio format.

The station was assigned the call sign KZXD by the Federal Communications Commission on May 2, 2011. The station changed its call sign to KBKO to June 18, 2012.

References

External links
 Official Website
 FCC Public Inspection File for KBKO
 

Radio stations established in 2012
2012 establishments in Alaska
Catholic radio stations
Kodiak, Alaska
BKO
Catholic Church in Alaska